The Works is a shelved 3D computer animated feature film, partially produced from 1979 to 1986. It would have been the first entirely 3D CGI film if it had been finished as intended, and included contributions from individuals who would go on to work at digital animation pioneers Pixar and DreamWorks Animation.

The film was developed by the staff of the Computer Graphics Lab in association with the New York Institute of Technology in Old Westbury, New York. The name was inspired by the original meaning of the word "robot", derived from "robota" ("work"), a word found in many Slavic languages. It was originally intended to be approximately 90 minutes long although less than 10 minutes were known to be produced. A trailer of the film was screened at SIGGRAPH in 1982. The project also resulted in other groundbreaking computer animations such as 3DV, Sunstone, Inside a Quark and some segments of the short film The Magic Egg from 1984.

Plot 
The story, written by Lance Williams, was never finalized but centered around "Ipso Facto", a charming elliptical robot, and the heroine, a young female pilot nicknamed "T-Square". The story was set at some time in the distant future when a malfunctioning computer, "The Works", triggered a devastating last World War but then, realizing what it had done, set out to repopulate the planet entirely with robots. T-Square, who worked and lived in a nearby asteroid belt, vowed to journey to Earth and fight to make it safe for the return of her fellow space-faring humanity. Many staff-members contributed designs and modeled characters and sets under the coordination of art director Bil Maher who created blueprint-style designs for T-Square and many of the 25 robots called for by the script. Dick Lundin, legendary for his exhaustive and elaborate creations, designed and animated a huge mining ship and the gigantic robot "Ant" which was to be one of the villains in control of the Earth.

Pre-production 
The founder of NYIT, entrepreneur and eccentric millionaire Dr. Alexander Schure, had a long and ardent interest in animation. He was a great admirer of Walt Disney and dreamed of making animated features like those from the golden age of theatrical animation. He had already created a traditional animation facility at NYIT. After visiting the University of Utah and seeing the potential of the computer technology in the form of the computer drawing program Sketchpad created by Ivan Sutherland, he told his people to pore over the Utah research center and get him one of everything they had. He then established the NYIT Computer Graphics Lab, buying state-of-the-art equipment and hiring major researchers from throughout the computer graphics field.

At first, one of CGL's main goals was to use computers to produce 2D animation and invent tools to assist traditional animators in their work. Schure reasoned that it should be possible to develop computer technology that would make the animation process cheaper and faster. An early version of the CAPS system later used by Disney animators were among the tools they created there.

Once its potential became clear, the main focus of the Lab became 3D computer graphics, and when Lance Williams presented his story, "The Works", the idea was to attempt to make it as a 3D computer animated feature. Schure enthusiastically agreed and green-lit the project as he too dreamt of a computer animated movie and had this in mind when he created the facility. This movie project became the center of attention at NYIT CGL. For many of the individuals involved, it became a primary and personal goal to create the first computer generated feature.

While creating a one-of-a-kind film in a method that had never been done before was the motivation, the practical reason for the project was to continue to develop patentable tools while demonstrating what computer animation could accomplish for the entertainment industry. In theory the project's success would lead to significant improvements in visual effects and in the editing process in film and television. Integrating computer power into visual media held promise in terms of speed, cost, creativity, and quality compared to more conventional techniques. The arrival of "The Works" would have been the beginning of a new animation genre. Interested representatives from movie studios and television networks regularly toured the lab as did musicians Laurie Anderson and Peter Gabriel, puppeteer Jim Henson and animation legends Chuck Jones and Shamus Culhane.

Schure was well aware of the challenges and potential for success going into the project and consistently provided very extensive resources to aid the research and development of the necessary technologies. Schure also believed that his staff would work best if they were constantly being supplied with the latest computer hardware. This meant that with each new advance in the field, his staff would have to upgrade their systems, convert existing programs, and rework familiar tools for use on new machines. When these upgrades actually delayed production significantly, Schure kept himself isolated from the complaints of his staff but for his part there were never any budgetary constraints or the pressure of a release date.

Production difficulties 
While progress on The Works did manage to advance the level of computer animation technology significantly, the film itself was in development hell for nearly a decade and was eventually abandoned for several reasons. The staff was composed almost entirely of technical experts, such as engineers and programmers, with directors and editors considered unnecessary. When NYIT, with Schure as a director, produced a 2D feature known as Tubby the Tuba, the film did very poorly and shook their confidence in their ability to produce a film that would succeed critically or financially. The lukewarm reception of Disney's heavily computer-themed Tron did little to buoy the group's confidence in their ultimate success.

CGL was not working in a field without competition. George Lucas also realized the potential gains from computer animation, and in 1979, he created a new department of Lucasfilm which had the same goals as CGL, but ensured that movie industry professionals had a hand in the production. As Lucasfilm began headhunting for the best talent in the industry, many individuals struggling on "The Works" felt that Lucasfilm was a company more likely to succeed and abandoned NYIT. The Cornell University was another competitor, and NYIT lost some of its best people to them during the following years.

Losing interest 
Another major problem was in the computers themselves. They were among the best and most powerful of their kind but, compared to the computers of today, were too slow and underpowered to generate the number of images required for a theatrical film. Attempting to pick up the pace, Dr. Schure recommitted himself to the project and the NYIT Computer Graphics Lab had more than 60 employees at its peak. Some were dedicated to The Works while others made animations for advertisers as a way to soften the financial toll the prolonged project exacted. Now not only did the computer team have to continue do ground-breaking animation and tool development, but as the quality of their output improved, they attracted outside clients wanting to commission title animations, commercials, and scenes for music videos, jobs which further sapped energy from the production. Scientist Ned Greene looked at the situation, analyzed all the elements needed to the film and crunched the numbers with devastating results: with the technology available, even if all the models and animations were calculated, it would take seven years to output the rendered frames needed to complete the film. The fact was, that in spite of all the resources brought to bear, CGL did not have the human or technical capacity to create film quality sequences on the hardware of the time.

Once it had been shown that the film could not be realized, The Works was officially abandoned. A less ambitious project, 3DV, was attempted. In a bid to circumvent the filmmaking bottleneck, 3DV was intended to be a TV special with a script that would include footage originally intended for The Works repurposed as programming for an imaginary all-computer generated cable TV service. 3DV incorporated some of its own innovations like 3D lip-synching and compositing a CG character into a live-action scene but, other than a promotional edit which was shown at SIGGRAPH, this too went nowhere. Many of those who had been working at CGL were hired by others and took their ideas, techniques and experience to new places. The vision of Dr. Schure and the effort invested in The Works were at the forefront of technology which continued to evolve into both an artform and an industry.

Legacy 
People involved in the project were and are among the top computer graphics researchers and developers in the world and their early creations are now in common use in 3D modeling and animation programs and in editors like After Effects, Photoshop, and Flash. When the first computer animated feature was finally released in the form of 1995's Toy Story, Edwin Catmull, one of the founding fathers of the NYIT (New York Institute of Technology) Computer Graphics Lab and other Lab alumni had become members of Pixar's staff.

Partial credits 
 Lance Williams
 Paul Heckbert
 Dick Lundin
 Christie Barton
 Bil Maher

References

External links 
 The Works
 Pictures from "The Works" Film Project
 Slide Show
 Short clip

1970s computer-animated films
1980s computer-animated films
Unfinished animated films
1970s unfinished films
1980s unfinished films
Cancelled films
1980s English-language films
1970s English-language films